A bear spear was a medieval type of spear used in hunting for bears and other large animals. The sharpened head of a bear spear was enlarged and usually took the form of a bay leaf. Right under the head there was a short crosspiece that helped fix the spear in the body of an animal and keep it at a distance from the hunter.

The bear spear was similar to a boar spear, but it had a longer and harder shaft and a larger head. Often it was placed against the ground on its rear point, which made it easier to hold the weight of an attacking beast.

The bear spear was used against the largest animals, not only bears, but also wisents and war horses, thus not only in hunting, but in warfare as well. It could also be used against smaller animals such as boars, but in that case it was more unwieldy than the specialized boar spear.

In the Slavic countries it was known as a rogatina and used since at least the 12th century. Ruthenian (Kievan Rus') chronicles first mention its use as a military weapon in 1149, and as a hunting weapon in 1255, though it was used by Prince Daniel of Galicia in boar hunting. In Germany, the bear spear or Bärenspieß was known from at least the Late Middle Ages but was rather rare when compared to Eastern Europe due to the much smaller bear population.

References

External links
Bärenspieß in The Metropolitan Museum of Art (New York)

Spears
Hunting equipment
Polearms
Bears and humans